George Parks may refer to:

 George Alexander Parks (1883–1984), American engineer and Governor of Alaska Territory 
 George N. Parks (1953–2010), University of Massachusetts band director
 George Parks (Medal of Honor) (1823–?), American Medal of Honor recipient
 W. George Parks (1904–1975), chemist
 George Parks Highway, a major highway in Alaska, which was named for George Alexander Parks